In mathematics, Suslin's theorem may refer to:
The Quillen–Suslin theorem (formerly the Serre conjecture), due to Andrei Suslin.
Any of several theorems about analytic sets due to Mikhail Yakovlevich Suslin; in particular:
There is an analytic subset of the reals that is not Borel
An analytic set whose complement is also analytic is a Borel set, a special case of the Lusin separation theorem
Any analytic set in Rn is the projection of a Borel set in Rn+1 
Analytic sets can be constructed using the Suslin operation